The Middle Spring Presbyterian Church was first built in 1738 by some of the earliest Scotch Irish settlers in Pennsylvania, and is much discussed in the histories of early Pennsylvania in general and Cumberland County, Pennsylvania in particular.

Scotch-Irish Settlers
Middle Spring Presbyterian Church is located in Cumberland County, Pennsylvania in the small community of Middle Spring, Pennsylvania on present day Pennsylvania State Route 4001 (old Pennsylvania 696), two and six-tenths miles north of Shippensburg, Pennsylvania. A group of Scotch Irish immigrants settled in this area in about 1730. The Scotch Irish were the earliest settlers on the Pennsylvania frontier of the early 18th century. As one author puts it:

Founding of the Church

In those days, the Middle Spring area was very much a part of this rugged frontier, where Indian attacks were common. Many of these early settlers fell victim to these attacks. These immigrants brought their Scotch Presbyterian origins with them. Presbyterian preaching began on this site in the open air as early as 1736. These settlers erected a Presbyterian Church building at this Middle Spring site in 1738, close to the bank of the small Middle Spring creek that ran through the area. The pioneer Scotch-Irish settlers in the Cumberland Valley almost always built their churches near streams and springs to have available an abundant source of water. The first building was a log church, which became not only a house of worship but a gathering place for the early settlers in the area. There are two other springs in the area – Big Spring and Rocky Spring. They called the church site "Middle Spring", because it was located midway between the Big Spring and the Rocky Spring. The church was thirty-five feet square. It had slab benches, a dirt floor and was unheated. The pulpit was high and was set against the wall. The precentor's desk was positioned right below and in front of it.

Attending the Frontier Church

Prolific local historian, Belle Swope writes the following about her family members, Robert Quigley and his wife, Mary Jacob Quigley, who were among the early members of the Middle Spring Presbyterian Church at a time when it still held services in the very wild frontier of backwoods Pennsylvania.

Original Church Replaced
The parishioners replaced the first log church with another in the 1760s. In turn, they replaced this church with the "Old Stone Church" in 1781. However, it suffered from a "structural defect". So, the congregation had to tear it down and replace it in 1847. At that time, they moved the church from where the old cemetery is still located (about one-tenth mile to the northwest) to its present location. A Christian Education Building was added to the 1847 sanctuary in 1964. There are four cemeteries associated with Middle Spring Church: the Lower Cemetery, the Upper Cemetery, and the Modern Cemetery; Hannah's Cemetery is located outside of Newburg.

Famous Members
 
Many of the original settlers of Cumberland County are buried in the Middle Spring Presbyterian Church Cemeteries. Among those buried there are Hugh Brady and Hannah Brady, parents of Major John Brady (whose many exploits on the Pennsylvania frontier are commemorated in a monument in Muncy, Pennsylvania). They are also the grandparents of John's sons, Captain Samuel Brady, of Brady's Leap fame and of Samuel's brother, United States Army Major General Hugh Brady, both of whom attended this church. Their maternal grandparents James and Jeanette Quigley are buried there as well.{ A detailed modern history of Middle Spring Presbyterian Church is available in Paul E. Gill, Ye People of Hopewell: A 250th Anniversary History of the Middle Spring Presbyterian Church,(Shippensburg: 1988).}

References

Presbyterian churches in Pennsylvania
Province of Pennsylvania
Churches in Cumberland County, Pennsylvania
Scotch-Irish American culture in Pennsylvania
Scotch-Irish American history
Churches completed in 1738
1738 establishments in Pennsylvania